Liding, sometimes lixie, is the practice of rewriting ancient Chinese character forms in clerical or regular script. Liding is often used in Chinese textual studies.

Definition and terminology 

During the Han dynasty, the clerical script reached its maturation, in which Chinese characters are written in such a way that is largely rectilinear and readily segmented into strokes. The script in current use, the  regular script, inherited this feature. By comparison, the scripts in use prior to the maturation of the clerical script, including the various scripts from the time period spanning the Shang dynasty, the Zhou dynasty, the Warring States era and the Qin dynasty, employed more sinuous lines, less stable shapes, and more ambiguous stroke segmentations. 

This remarkable difference in style, combined with the fact that the graphic structures of the characters have changed significantly over time, creates difficulty for recognition and analysis of the characters. Liding refers to the attempt to regularize the ancient scripts into the style of post-clerical writing, so as to aid recognition of not only the characters themselves but their individual components.

In An Outline of Grammatology, Chinese paleographer Qiu Xigui defined liding as "the transcription of ancient script forms into clerical-style forms while preserving the shapes of the former". The nomenclature clerically identified transcription is used by Chinese archaeologist Xing Wen, who gives as its definition "...a traditional Chinese paleographical practice for transcriptions of ancient inscriptions... [that] identifies the Clerical Script equivalent of the ancient character".

Despite the literal meaning of the name, liding in modern studies renders the character forms into regular script, as it is what most modern writings and typefaces are based on. The term kaiding is occasionally used to specifically refer to liding in the style of regular script, albeit not as often.  

A character that is the result of liding of an ancient graph is called a liding zi or liding character.

Broad and narrow liding 
Liding traditionally lacks a strictly-defined code of practice. While general definitions are given, Chinese palaeographers tends not to elaborate on methodological details.

Sometimes, to specify how strictly the transcriptions adhere to the original graphs, the terms broad liding and narrow (strict) liding are used, although their exact meanings are left largely unclarified. Chinese scholar Li Shoukui proposes the distinction between liding by strokes and liding by components:
 Liding by strokes is the strictest form of liding, converting the character to regular style while aiming to preserve every individual stroke in the graph, save that some stylistic details may be ignored. In practice, this method is used sparingly, and is often to preserve idiosyncrasies in certain graphs or transcribing unrecognized characters. Even in the case of the latter, direct tracing is preferred over liding in order to avoid erroneous conversions.  
 In liding by components, the structure is preserved on the level of components instead of strokes, and more alternations are allowed such as removing redundant strokes or completing ellipted parts. Liding by components is the main liding method, as it displays the composition of the graph in a manner that is the most accessible.  
The following table provides some examples of liding. In the "Possible liding" column, the graphs in each box are shown in increasing order of broadness. As is evidenced, the liding to one graph is often not unique. The ones provided in the table are not in any way exhaustive.

Comparison to other methods of transcription 
Despite the lack of a rigorous definition, liding is generally considered distinct from the other two methods of transcription:
 The direct tracing of the graph. Tracing, as its name suggests, is the practice of tracing the original graph with minimal or no alterations. This is done when the transcriber is unable to rewrite the graph in question as a clerical form (for instance, when the graph is purely pictorial, or when the transcriber cannot give a plausible interpretation of the structure of the graph).

 The interpretative transcription or interpretation of the graph. While liding preserves structure to some degree, interpretation only seeks to preserve meaning and completely disregards form. It substitutes the character in question with the corresponding character that is prevailing today to aid the understanding of the material.
However, it is worth noting that interpretative transcription is sometimes seen as a kind of broad liding.

Difference from libian 

While liding refers to the transcription of archaic scripts in modern style, libian is the natural evolution from ancient scripts to clerical scripts. As the graphs often changed drastically in structure in the process of libian, the liding of a character could be considerably different from the same character after libian. Taking 年 ("year; harvest") as an example:

Use

In palaeography 
As a means of transcription, liding is an important part of the study of historical texts. It unearths structural information of the graph that was obscured by the archaic handwriting style, making it more accessible for modern uses. Additionally, the process of liding involves identifying the clerical counterparts of the various components of a character form, and thus in itself presents an analysis of the composition of the character in question.  In research publications, liding is extensively used. 

Liding is also used for digitizing historical scripts. A number of historical text databases with transcription provide liding versions of transcription.

In dictionaries 
Chinese dictionaries have, as a traditional practice, utilized the liding forms to record ancient variants in dictionaries. The Song dynasty saw the rise of epigraphy; as a result, a number of character dictionaries and rime dictionaries at the time, including Leipian and Jiyun, preserved archaic variants in regular script. After Song, with the waning of traditional Chinese epigraphy, though the practice survived, lexicographers mostly took the archaic forms directly from earlier dictionaries like Yupian, Leipian, and Jiyun.

For example, the image shown is the entry of the character  excerpted from the Song version of Yupian.

The text in the image is read from top to bottom, right to left; it may be transcribed as follows (the zhouwen liding graph is denoted by △):(",  qie, which is to request; to thank; to pray for happiness. △ is the zhouwen.")

Unicode encoding 
Rare forms encountered in ancient scripts are sometimes restricted to a specific period or even to a limited number of historical artefacts, and liding is a process that often requires fine structural differentiation; it is thus not unusual that character forms required in liding are unencoded in Unicode. Specialized fonts sometimes utilize Private Use Areas to store liding graphs that see non-oneoff uses but are unencoded.

A number of liding-specific characters do have their dedicated Unicode code points. Notably, there are 1808 ideographs introduced from the work Yinzhou Jinwen Jicheng Yinde ( [Concordance of Shang and Zhou Dynasty Bronze Inscriptions]), with 365 in CJK Unified Ideographs Extension C, 1410 in Extension E and 33 in Extension F. The majority of them are liding forms of graphs found in the bronze inscriptions. Their kIRG_GSource field values start with GZJW.

References 

Chinese orthography